The Maryland Attorney General election of 2010 was held on 2 November 2010. Incumbent attorney general Douglas Gansler encountered no official candidates in his bid for a second term. 

, this was the last time Garrett County voted Democratic in any statewide election.

Candidates

Democratic Party
 Doug Gansler, incumbent Attorney General of Maryland

Primary election

General election

References

See also

Attorney General
Maryland
Maryland Attorney General elections